stages (stylized in all lowercase) is the second studio album by American country music singer and songwriter Cassadee Pope, released on February 1, 2019, through Awake Music. Pope co-wrote 7 of the 11 tracks on the album produced by Corey Crowder.

Recording
About writing and recording for the new album, Pope stated: "I really don’t know how I would have moved on with my life without this album. In the past, I made records I thought everyone could relate to. This time, I didn’t think about that at all. I wanted to tell a story of my truths and perspective on how I approached life in hopes that the messages reach someone who may need help in their own stumble."

Guest vocals are provided by Shay Mooney (of Dan + Shay) on "If My Heart Had a Heart" and RaeLynn, Lauren Alaina, and Lindsay Ell on "Distracted."

Promotion
On November 30, 2018, Pope was announced as the headliner during the CMT Next Women of Country Tour with guests Clare Dunn and Hannah Ellis starting in April 2019. On January 17, 2019, Pope announced she would be joining the US leg of country singer Maren Morris' GIRL: The World Tour as a supporting act to promote her album.

Commercial performance
As of February 2019 the album has sold 2,300 copies in the US.

Track listing

Personnel

Performers
 Cassadee Pope - lead vocals
 Shay Mooney - background vocals (track 5)
 RaeLynn - background vocals (track 7)
 Lauren Alaina - background vocals (track 7)
 Lindsay Ell - background vocals (track 7)

Charts

Release history

References

2019 albums
Cassadee Pope albums